The 1959 FIBA World Championship was the 3rd FIBA World Championship, the international basketball world championship for men's teams. It was hosted by Chile from 16 to 31 January 1959. Amaury Antônio Pasos was named the MVP.

The hosting cities for the competition were Antofagasta, Concepción, Temuco, Valparaíso, with the final stages being held at the capital of Santiago.

The final stages were supposed to be held at the newly constructed Metropolitan Indoor Stadium, but because the venue was not finished in time the games were postponed by a year from the original date and moved outdoors to the Estadio Nacional de Chile, configured in a way that the games were seen by a crowd of 16,000.

Competing nations

Competition format
 Preliminary round: Three groups of four teams play each other once; top two teams progress to the final round, bottom two teams relegated to classification round.
 Classification round:
 First round: Two groups of three teams (A1, B2, C1 and A2, B1, C2) play each other once.
 Second round: Top teams from each group play for eighth, second placers play for tenth, and last placers play for twelfth.
 Final round: All top two from preliminary round group play each other once. The team with the best record wins the championship.

Preliminary round

Group A

Group B

Group C

Classification round

First round

Group D

Group E

Second round

Twelfth place playoff

Tenth place playoff

Eighth place playoff

Final round

Awards

Final rankings

Top scorers (points per game)
 James T. L. Chen (Formosa) 20.1
 Juan "Pachin" Vicens (Puerto Rico) 19.7
 Wlamir Marques (Brazil) 18.6
 Jerry Vayda (USA) 18
 Lio Jin Ron (Formosa) 16.7
 Dick Welsh (USA) 16.4
 Viktor Radev (Bulgaria) 15.25
 Amaury Pasos (Brazil) 15.22
 Jose Angel Cestero (Puerto Rico) 14.3
 Evelio Droz (Puerto Rico) 13.7

All-Tournament team

 Juan Vicéns
 Amaury Pasos - (MVP)
 Wlamir Marques
 Atanas Atanasov
 Jānis Krūmiņš

References

External links
 
 
 FIBA profile
 Todor66 profile
 The-Sports profile
 Linguasport profile

FIBA Basketball World Cup
International basketball competitions hosted by Chile
World Championship
1959 in Chilean sport